Delhi Metropolitan Council election, 1983 was held in Indian National Capital Territory of Delhi to elect 56 councillors to the Delhi Metropolitan Council. This Council had no legislative powers, but only an advisory role in administration of the territory.

Results

!colspan=10|
|-
!colspan=2|Party
!Candidates
!Seats won
!Votes
!Vote %
|-
| 
|align="left"|Indian National Congress||56||34||856,055||47.50%
|-
| 
|align="left"|Bharatiya Janata Party||50||19||666,605||36.99%
|-
| 
|align="left"|Lok Dal||6||2||73,765||4.09%
|-
| 
|align="left"|Janata Party||37||1||65,980||3.66%
|-
!colspan=2|Total !! 400 !! 56 !! 1,802,118 !!
|-
|}

The election elected Fourth Delhi Metropolitan Council. Purushottam Goel was Chairman of the Council, Tajdar Babar being Deputy Chairman.

Elected members

References

1983 elections in India
Elections in Delhi
Local elections in Delhi
Autonomous district council elections in India
1980s in Delhi